The Panzerkorps Feldherrnhalle was a German panzer corps that fought on the Eastern Front during the Second World War.

History

The Panzerkorps Feldherrnhalle was formed on 27 November 1944 by redesignating IV. Armeekorps which had been destroyed on the Eastern Front in August during the Soviet Second Jassy–Kishinev Offensive, Its corps units came from Sturm-Division "Rhodos" ("Assault division 'Rhodes'") and Panzer-Grenadier-Brigade 17. The corps was first deployed in Hungary in February 1945.

The panzerkorps surrendered to the US Army at the end of the war.

Commanders

Panzerkorps Feldherrnhalle

Orders of battle
Battle of Debrecen, Hungary, October 1944
As "60th Panzergrenadier-Division Feldherrnhalle"
Division Stab
Füsilier-Regiment Feldherrnhalle
Grenadier-Regiment Feldherrnhalle
Panzer-Abteilung Feldherrnhalle
Panzer-Aufklärungs-Abteilung Feldherrnhalle
Artillerie Regiment Feldherrnhalle
FlaK-Bataillon Feldherrnhalle
Pionier-Bataillon Feldherrnhalle
Nachrichten-Kompanie Feldherrnhalle

Budapest, Hungary, February 1945
As Panzer-Division Feldherrnhalle 1
Division Stab
Panzer-Regiment Feldherrnhalle
Panzer-Battalion
Panzergrenadier-Battalion (half-track)
schwere Panzer-Abteilung Feldherrnhalle
Panzergrenadier-Regiment Feldherrnhalle
Panzerjäger-Abteilung Feldherrnhalle
Panzer-Aufklärungs-Abteilung Feldherrnhalle
Pionier-Bataillon Feldherrnhalle
Artillerie-Regiment Feldherrnhalle
Nachrichten-Kompanie Feldherrnhalle

Operation Spring Awakening, Hungary, March 1945
As Panzerkorps Feldherrnhalle
Korps Stab
Korps-Füsilier-Regiment Feldherrnhalle
[[German 503rd Heavy Panzer Detachment|Schwere-Panzer-Abteilung Feldherrnhalle]]404. Artillerie-Regiment404. Panzer-Pionier-Bataillon44. Panzer-Nachrichten-BataillonPanzer-Feldersatz-Regiment FeldherrnhallePanzer-Division Feldherrnhalle 1Panzer-Division Feldherrnhalle 2''

Footnotes

References

 
 Sanchez, Alfonso Escuadra - Feldherrnhalle: Forgotten Elite

P00F
Sturmabteilung
Military units and formations established in 1944
Military units and formations disestablished in 1945

de:Panzer-Division Feldherrnhalle 1